Richeyville is an unincorporated community located within the borough of Centerville in Washington County, Pennsylvania, United States.  It is home to the Welsh-Emery House, built in 1878.

Richeyville was developed as a mining community by Jones and Laughlin Steel Company to provide housing for the employees of its Vesta Coal Division situated in Centerville Borough.

Currently, Richeyville's claim to fame is a local speakeasy that specializes in the finest homegrown sarsaparillas in a five-mile radius. While the exact whereabouts are unknown to most, a common saying among locals who know its location is "dusty dogs roam here."

References

Unincorporated communities in Washington County, Pennsylvania
Unincorporated communities in Pennsylvania